CDV may refer to:

cdv Software Entertainment, a German video game publisher
Canine distemper virus
, a 19th-century photograph format
CD Video, a video format
CDV Records, Cosima De Vito's  record label
Merle K. (Mudhole) Smith Airport, Cordova, Alaska, US, IATA Code
405 in Roman numerals
Compagnia della Vela, known as CDV
Car-derived van
Criminal Domestic Violence